Queer Eye is an American reality television series, initially released on February 7, 2018 on Netflix. It is a reboot of the Bravo eponymous series, featuring a new "Fab Five": Antoni Porowski, food and wine expert; Tan France, fashion expert; Karamo Brown, culture expert; Bobby Berk, design expert; and Jonathan Van Ness, grooming expert.

In each episode, the "Fab Five" spend a week applying their expertise to help some individual—that episode's "hero"—to improve their lifestyle and achieve better satisfaction in their life.

The award-winning show is known for its strong representation amongst the LGBT community and communities that include people of color. 58 episodes of Queer Eye have been released. The show's fifth season premiered on June 5, 2020; the show was renewed for a sixth season which premiered on December 31, 2021. On April 28, 2022 it was reported that a seventh season is in the making.

A German adaptation of Queer Eye premiered on Netflix on March 9, 2022 and a Brazilian adaptation premiered on August 24, 2022.

Main cast
 Antoni Porowski – "Food and Wine", expert on alcohol, beverages, food preparation, and presentation
 Bobby Berk – "Design", expert on interior design and home organization
 Jonathan Van Ness – "Grooming", expert on hair, grooming, personal hygiene, and makeup
 Karamo Brown – "Culture and Lifestyle", expert on popular culture, relationships and social interaction
 Tan France – "Fashion", expert on clothing, fashion, and personal styling

Production
Creator credit is given to David Collins. In contrast to the original series, which was filmed in the New York area, the first two seasons of the reboot were filmed in Atlanta and neighboring Georgia towns. Production moved to Kansas City, Missouri for the third and fourth seasons (beginning production on June 16, 2018), Philadelphia for the fifth season, and Austin, Texas for the sixth.

David Collins has said that he is interested in filming a season of Queer Eye in the Midwest, and that he would like to bring the Fab Five to his hometown, Cincinnati, Ohio: "I'm from Cincinnati, Ohio, born and raised. I would like to go the tristate region, Ohio, Indiana, and Kentucky, because you can base in Cincinnati and go across the bridge to Kentucky and go up the interstate to Indiana. The corn-fed midwestern folk are where I'm from—and I love actually being from Ohio, it's a great place to be from." The Fab Five later voiced fictionalized versions of themselves in an adult animated series, Big Mouth.

Release
All eight episodes of the first series were released on Netflix on February 7, 2018. Netflix's provided maturity rating is TV-14.

The series was renewed for a second season that aired on June 15, 2018. Speaking to Variety, interior design expert Bobby Berk stated that season 2 was filmed at the tail end of season one. The season features a new theme song by Betty Who. The season includes an episode focused on a man named Skyler who is transgender. Other makeover heroes include a Walmart employee, a young musician, a mayor, a woman, and a man trying to graduate college.

On June 6, 2018, it was reported that an episode was being filmed in the town of Yass, New South Wales in Australia. Yass was chosen due to the fact that "its name matches one of the boys' favorite sayings: 'yaass'". On June 21, 2018, the 20-minute Yass episode was released online.

On June 18, 2019, the series was renewed for a fourth and fifth season. The fourth season was released on July 19, 2019. A four–episode special season called Queer Eye: We're in Japan! was released on November 1, 2019. This special season also features Kiko Mizuhara as the Fab Five's Tokyo tour guide, and Naomi Watanabe makes a special appearance. On March 11, 2020, Netflix renewed the series for a sixth season to be filmed in Austin, Texas. On May 14, 2020, it was announced that the series' fifth season would be released on June 5, 2020, and would consist of 10 episodes filmed in Philadelphia, Pennsylvania. The sixth season was released on December 31, 2021.

Episodes

Series overview

Season 1 (2018)

Season 2 (2018)

Special (2018)

Season 3 (2019)

Season 4 (2019)

We're in Japan! (2019)

Season 5 (2020)

Special (2021)

Season 6 (2021)

Reception

On review aggregator website Rotten Tomatoes, the first season holds an approval rating of 97% based on 32 reviews, and an average rating of 8.23/10. The website's critical consensus reads, "Queer Eye adapts for a different era without losing its style, charm, or sense of fun, proving that the show's formula remains just as sweetly addictive even after a change in location and a new group of hosts." On Metacritic, the season has a weighted average score of 73 out of 100, based on 9 critics, indicating "generally favorable reviews".

The second season has an 87% approval rating on Rotten Tomatoes, based on 30 reviews, with an average rating of 8.36/10. The site's critical consensus reads, "Earnest and endearing, Queer Eye tear-inducing reality wiles continue to challenge social norms — and, in its best moments, the Fab Five themselves." On Metacritic, it has a score of 79 out of 100, based on 8 critics, indicating "generally favorable reviews".

The third season has an approval rating of 92% based on 12 reviews, with an average rating of 8/10 on Rotten Tomatoes. The website's critical consensus reads, "Affirming and uplifting as ever, Queer Eye third season settles into a nearly formulaic groove — thankfully the concoction continues to work like gangbusters thanks to the Fab Five's comforting Midas touch."

The fourth season has an approval rating of 92% based on 12 reviews with an average rating of 8/10 on Rotten Tomatoes. The website's critical consensus reads, "The Fab Five keep going deeper and just keep getting better — Can you believe?"

The fifth season has an approval rating of 100% based on 6 reviews, with an average rating of 8/10 on Rotten Tomatoes.

Awards and nominations

Other appearances

Jill Biden fundraising campaign 

In September 2020, the Queer Eye cast partnered with Jill Biden for a grassroots fundraiser for her husband Joe Biden's U.S. presidential campaign. The cast recorded a video with Jill Biden and advocated for Joe Biden to be the next U.S. president. In the video, the cast comments on the Trump administration and argues that Biden verbatim will be able to minimise the impact of but not limited to the COVID-19 pandemic, homeless veterans, environmental issues, trans and black lives.

Tan France was also vocal about his opinion on Trump's immigration policies. "What I will be thinking when I'm voting is… first, oh gosh, I feel a bit emotional. I’ll be thinking of the fact that I am a representative of so many things that have been so negatively portrayed over the last three and a half years… We want to be respected. Muslims want to be respected, people of colour want be respected, the Black community wants to be respected, gay people want to be respected, trans people want to be respected."

Lizzo x Queer Eye Music Video — "Soulmate" 
The Fab Five appear with American singer and rapper Lizzo as animated cartoon characters in her music video for the song "Soulmate." The music video was released at the end of June 2020 in celebration of Pride month.

Taylor Swift Music Video — "You Need to Calm Down" 
The cast also appeared on Taylor Swift's "You Need to Calm Down" music video in June 2019, along with numerous other queer celebrities. The song and music video was portrayed as a celebration of the LGBTQ+ community and the music video ends with a call to sign a petition supporting the Equality Act which would protect LGBTQ+ people from discrimination. When there was some controversy around the video where some criticised Taylor Swift for being opportunistic in her public allyship, Tan France spoke up in support of Swift, calling her a "powerful ally".

References

External links
 
 

2010s American LGBT-related television series
2010s LGBT-related reality television series
2010s American reality television series
2018 American television series debuts
2020s American LGBT-related television series
2020s LGBT-related reality television series
2020s American reality television series
American LGBT-related reality television series
American LGBT-related web series
Gay-related television shows
English-language Netflix original programming
Television shows filmed in Georgia (U.S. state)
Television shows filmed in Australia
Television shows filmed in Missouri
Television shows filmed in Kansas
Television shows filmed in Illinois
Television shows filmed in Japan
Television shows filmed in Pennsylvania
Television shows filmed in New Jersey
Television series reboots
Television series by ITV Studios
Makeover reality television series
Primetime Emmy Award for Outstanding Reality Program winners